Football matches between K.S.K. Beveren and Sporting Lokeren are described as the Derby of the Waasland. It is a match between two cities located in Waasland.

At the end of the 1970s, the football hegemony in Belgian football shifted to the Waasland. The local football clubs were bursting with talent, and the Belgian top clubs were put to the test.
In Beveren this led to two national titles (1979, 1984), two cup victories (1978, 1983) and a European semi-final against FC Barcelona. Twenty-five kilometers away, they had to settle for less, although the tricolores did finish second in the competition in the 1980–1981 season and reached the quarterfinals of the UEFA Cup against AZ. In addition, Lokeren closed the competition in fourth place each time between 1979 and 1982.

The rivalry between the two clubs dates from this period of success. It started on the green mat with legendary duels and clashes between Beverengoalkeeper Jean-Marie Pfaff and Lokerenspits Preben Elkjær. In the early 1990s, the fight moved outside the stadium, so this match was invariably regarded as a risk match by law enforcement.

References

K.S.K. Beveren
K.S.C. Lokeren Oost-Vlaanderen
Football rivalries in Belgium